Events from the year 1219 in Ireland.

Incumbent
Lord: Henry III

Events
 Sibella, the great-granddaughter of the Norman leader Strongbow, was granted the manor in Castlecomer.

Births

Deaths
 John de Courcy (also John de Courci), an Anglo-Norman knight

References